Shelby is a city in Bolivar County, Mississippi, United States. The population was 2,229 at the 2010 census, down from 2,926 in 2000. The town of Shelby was established in 1853 by Tom Shelby, who had purchased a block of land there from the federal government.

Geography
Shelby is located at  (33.949293, -90.765241).

Demographics

2020 census

As of the 2020 United States Census, there were 2,021 people, 649 households, and 442 families residing in the city.

2010 census
As of the 2010 United States Census, there were 2,229 people living in the city. The racial makeup of the city was 94.3% Black, 4.7% White and 0.2% from two or more races. 0.8% were Hispanic or Latino of any race.

2000 census
As of the census of 2000, there were 2,926 people, 919 households, and 677 families living in the city. The population density was 1,079.5 people per square mile (416.9/km). There were 963 housing units at an average density of 355.3 per square mile (137.2/km). The racial makeup of the city was 7.93% White, 91.08% African American, 0.07% Native American, 0.10% Asian, 0.38% from other races, and 0.44% from two or more races. Hispanic or Latino of any race were 0.99% of the population.

There were 919 households, out of which 43.3% had children under the age of 18 living with them, 26.3% were married couples living together, 41.7% had a female householder with no husband present, and 26.3% were non-families. 23.1% of all households were made up of individuals, and 10.0% had someone living alone who was 65 years of age or older. The average household size was 3.07 and the average family size was 3.60.

In the city, the population was spread out, with 37.5% under the age of 18, 9.8% from 18 to 24, 24.5% from 25 to 44, 15.8% from 45 to 64, and 12.5% who were 65 years of age or older. The median age was 27 years. For every 100 females, there were 82.4 males. For every 100 females age 18 and over, there were 70.4 males.

The median income for a household in the city was $17,798, and the median income for a family was $20,368. Males had a median income of $26,250 versus $19,554 for females. The per capita income for the city was $10,567. About 39.9% of families and 44.5% of the population were below the poverty line, including 56.5% of those under age 18 and 21.3% of those age 65 or over.

Education
Shelby is served by the North Bolivar Consolidated School District, formerly known as the North Bolivar School District until it consolidated in 2014.

Students are zoned to Brooks Elementary School (in Duncan), as it belonged to the pre-consolidation North Bolivar School District, and Northside High School (the only secondary school in the district).

Northside High opened in 2018 after Broad Street High School in Shelby consolidated into it. Shelby Middle School closed in 2018.

Notable people
 Walter Luzar "Choker" Campbell, musician
 Dorsett Terrell Davis, football player
 William S. Fischer, keyboardist, saxophonist, arranger, and composer
 Erma Franklin, gospel and R&B singer, sister of the gospel and R&B singer Aretha Franklin
 Hattie Littles, soul singer
 Sonny Boy Nelson, blues musician
 Delbert Tibbs, anti-death penalty activist
 Vera B. Rison, Michigan state legislator
 Mississippi Slim, blues musician
 Delbert Tibbs, writer and anti-death penalty activist
 Henry Townsend, blues singer most associated with St. Louis, Missouri, on the St. Louis Walk of Fame and a Mississippi Blues Trail marker
 Gerald Wilson, jazz trumpeter, composer and arranger

References

External links
City of Shelby official website

Cities in Mississippi
Cities in Bolivar County, Mississippi
Mississippi Blues Trail
1853 establishments in Mississippi
Populated places established in 1853